Aloísio Soares Neto (born 16 August 1997) is a Brazilian professional footballer who plays for Marítimo B as a centre back.

Football career
On 28 July 2018, Aloísio Neto made his debut in the first team, in a Taça da Liga match, winning 3–0 against Mafra.

On 31 October 2018, Aloísio Neto scored his first goal in the first team, in a Taça da Liga match, losing 3–2 against Feirense

References

External links

1997 births
Sportspeople from Niterói
Living people
Brazilian footballers
Association football defenders
C.S. Marítimo players
Primeira Liga players
Campeonato de Portugal (league) players
Brazilian expatriate footballers
Expatriate footballers in Portugal
Brazilian expatriate sportspeople in Portugal